Colonel John Selwyn (20 August 1688 – 5 November 1751) of Matson, Gloucestershire,a British Army officer, courtier and politician, sat in the House of Commons between 1715 and 1751.

Selwyn was the eldest son of  Lieutenant-general William Selwyn, MP of Matson, Gloucestershire. He was commissioned into the Army in his infancy as ensign and lieutenant of the 3rd Foot Guards on 31 December 1688. His father died in 1702 whilst Governor of Jamaica and he inherited the Matson estate. He became captain and lieutenant-colonel in the 1st Foot Guards in 1707 and served in Flanders as aide-de-camp to  the Duke of Marlborough. By 1709, he married Mary Farrington, the daughter of  Lieutenant-general Thomas Farrington MP of Chislehurst.  He rose to the rank of Colonel of the 3rd Regiment of Foot in 1711 until 1713.

Selwyn was returned unopposed as Member of Parliament (MP) for Truro on the  Boscawen interest at the 1715 general election. He was also appointed Commissioner of the Equivalent in 1715. He was appointed clerk of the household to Prince of Wales in 1716 through the influence of  Lord Townshend. In 1717, he followed Lord Townsend into opposition and lost his Commissioner post. He was promoted to Groom of the Bedchamber to  the Prince of Wales in 1718. After the Whigs came together again in 1720, he was appointed to the post of Receiver General and comptroller of customs, but had to give up his seat in the House of Commons in February 1721 and did not stand in 1722.

In 1726 Selwyn acquired property at Whitchurch which gave him a seat in Parliament. He was Mayor of Gloucester in 1727 and after passing the Receivership to his brother, returned himself as MP for Whitchurch at the 1727 general election. After the Prince of Wales became King George II in 1727, Selwyn continued as Groom of the Bedchamber until 1730, when he became treasurer of the Queen's Household. As such he was accountable for payments from the Treasury to support Richmond Lodge and the households of the Duke of Cumberland, the Princesses Amelia and  Caroline, and the Princesses Mary and Louise, children of the King and Queen.

He was a member of the gaols committee of the House of Commons in the year 1729 to 1730. In 1733 he bought the manor of Ludgershall, which gave him electoral influence at Gloucester. He was Mayor of Gloucester again in 1734 and was elected in a contest as MP for Gloucester at the 1734 general election. He spoke for the new colony of Georgia in a debate on the army estimates on 3 February 1738 and voted regularly with the Government. He was re-elected MP for Gloucester at the 1741 general election. He was appointed paymaster of marines in 1746 but, to avoid a by-election, did not take up the post until the 1747 general election when he was returned unopposed. However the post ceased to exist when the Marines were disbanded in 1748. He was appointed treasurer to the Prince of Wales in May 1751.

Selwyn died on 5 November 1751. He had two sons and a daughter, but was predeceased by his elder son John. His estate went to his second son  George Augustus Selwyn.

References

1688 births
1751 deaths
People from Gloucester
Grenadier Guards officers
Scots Guards officers
Buffs (Royal East Kent Regiment) officers
Members of the Parliament of Great Britain for English constituencies
Members of the Parliament of Great Britain for constituencies in Cornwall
British MPs 1715–1722
British MPs 1727–1734
British MPs 1734–1741
British MPs 1741–1747
British MPs 1747–1754